Kim Kwang-Seok 3rd Music Collection is the third album by South Korean singer Kim Kwang-Seok.

Track listing

References

1992 albums